Topalhəsənli (also, Topalgasanli, Topalgasanly, and Topalkhasanly) is a village and municipality in the Goygol Rayon of Azerbaijan.  It has a population of 1,715.

References 

Populated places in Goygol District